Easton is an unincorporated community in Wayne County, in the U.S. state of Ohio.

History
Easton was originally called Slangerville, and under the latter name was laid out in 1843. A post office called Easton was established in 1850, and remained in operation until 1905.

References

Unincorporated communities in Wayne County, Ohio
Unincorporated communities in Ohio